"Find Another Way" is a song recorded by German musician known under the pseudonym of Captain Hollywood Project, released in 18 March in 1995 as the second single from the project's second album, Animals or Human (1995). It was a hit in several countries, peaking at number four in Finland and number eight in Italy.

Chart performance
"Find Another Way" was a notable hit on the charts across Europe, but didn't reach the same level of success as the project's earlier single, "Flying High". It peaked within the Top 10 in Finland and Italy, as well as on MTV's European Top 20, where it made it to number nine. Additionally, it was a Top 20 hit in Austria, Denmark and Sweden, while reaching the Top 30 in Germany and Switzerland. In the UK, "Find Another Way" charted on the UK Singles Chart, reaching number 93 in its first week on the chart, on July 2, 1995. It was the last song by the project to chart there.

Critical reception
Juha Soininen wrote in his 2020 book, Move Your Body (2 The 90s): Unlimited Eurodance, that "Find Another Way" "was weirdy perky and a little bit annoying, so it didn't fit to his more somber style". James Hamilton from British magazine Music Weeks RM Dance Update described it as a "catchy 'oh oh oh oh' girl warbled and 'pompin' pompin' guy rapped ridiculously frantic 158.8bpm fierce cheesy Euro flier".

Music video
A music video was produced to promote the single, directed by Silver Haze. It was later published on YouTube in March 2017. The video has amassed almost 400,000 views as of September 2021.

Track listings
 CD maxi
 "Find Another Way" (Single Mix) (3:57)
 "Find Another Way" (Extended Mix) (6:09)
 "Odyssey of Emotions" (6:06)

Charts

Weekly charts

Year-end charts

References

1995 songs
1995 singles
Captain Hollywood Project songs
Songs written by Tony Dawson-Harrison